Eraserheads Anthology is a compilation album by Filipino alternative rock band Eraserheads. It was released by Musiko Records & BMG Records (Pilipinas), Inc. in 2004. It was the band's first greatest hits compilation album since their breakup in 2002. Anthology was first released in a two-disc set.

Track listing

All tracks are written by Ely Buendia, with:
 "Toyang" co-written with Marcus Adoro
 "Overdrive" and "Tamagotchi Baby" co-written with Raymund Marasigan
 "Superproxy" co-written with Francis Magalona
 "Run Barbi Run" co-written with Adoro, Marasigan, and Zabala
 "Police Woman" co-written with Adoro, Marasigan, and Begona Zabala
 "Kailan" co-written with Marasigan, Adoro, Hector Zabala, Annie Angala, Karing Evangelista, and Auraeus Solito

and except:
 "Sembreak" written by Marasigan
 "Tuwing Umuulan at Kapiling Ka" written by Ryan Cayabyab

References

Eraserheads albums
2004 compilation albums